15 Exitos Rancheros, Vol. 2 is the second compilation album by Al Hurricane, Al Hurricane, Jr., & Tiny Morrie. It is the fifteenth album released by the New Mexican musician Al Hurricane in 1994.

Track listing

References

Al Hurricane albums
New Mexico music albums